William Joseph Devane (born September 5, 1939) is an American actor. He is known for his role as Greg Sumner on the primetime soap opera Knots Landing (1983–1993) and as James Heller on the Fox serial dramas 24 (2001–2010) and 24: Live Another Day (2014). He is also known for his work in films such as Family Plot (1976), Marathon Man (1976), Rolling Thunder (1977), Payback (1999), and Space Cowboys (2000).

Early life
Devane was born on September 5, 1939, in Albany, New York, the son of Joseph Devane, who had been Franklin D. Roosevelt's chauffeur when he was governor of New York. His father was of Irish descent and his mother had Dutch and German ancestry. Devane graduated from Philip Schuyler High School in Albany, and then the American Academy of Dramatic Arts in New York City in 1962.

Career
Devane began his acting career with the New York Shakespeare Festival, where he performed in 15 plays. In 1966, Devane portrayed Robert F. Kennedy in the off-Broadway spoof MacBird. He gained acclaim for his role as President John F. Kennedy in a television docudrama about the Cuban Missile Crisis, The Missiles of October (1974), and again when he played blacklisted radio personality John Henry Faulk in the Emmy Award-winning TV movie Fear on Trial (1975). He is widely known for his ten years as the ambitious and hardnosed politician-turned-corporate titan Greg Sumner on Knots Landing.

In 1994, Devane appeared as Al Capone in Lois & Clark: The New Adventures of Superman in an episode entitled "That Old Gang of Mine". He also had a recurring role on the CBS show Early Edition (1996–2000) as the lead character's father. Devane appeared in the films McCabe & Mrs. Miller (1971); Lady Liberty (1971); Family Plot (1976), directed by Alfred Hitchcock; Marathon Man (1976); Rolling Thunder (1977); Yanks (1979); Testament (1983) with Jane Alexander; Timestalkers (1987) with Lauren Hutton and Klaus Kinski; Forgotten Sins (1996) with John Shea; Exception to the Rule (1997); Payback (1999);  Hollow Man and Space Cowboys (2000).

Devane has played members of the Presidential Cabinet on two evening dramas. In 2004, on The West Wing, he guest-starred as the secretary of state and potential vice presidential nominee. Devane appeared in several scenes with Martin Sheen; they also appeared together as President John F. Kennedy and his brother Robert, respectively, 30 years earlier in The Missiles of October (1974). In 2005, he joined the cast of 24 as Secretary of Defense James Heller for seasons four through six.

Later career
In 2004, Devane appeared in three episodes of Stargate SG-1 as President Henry Hayes and appears in the direct-to-DVD movie Stargate: Continuum.  He also co-starred in the short-lived sitcom Crumbs and as Brian's real-estate broker father in What About Brian (2006–07). In 2008, he appeared in Russ Emanuel's Chasing the Green alongside Jeremy London, Ryan Hurst, and Robert Picardo. He also appears as police officer turned psychologist Dr. Dix in the Jesse Stone mystery movies with Tom Selleck. In 2010, he appeared in the NCIS episode "Worst Nightmare" as a grandfather who is not what he appears to be, and is actually a former U.S. deep-cover special-operations agent, of a child kidnapped from Marine Corps Base Quantico.

In 2012, Devane began a recurring role as Grandpa Edward Grayson on the ABC primetime soap opera Revenge. Devane also played the President of the United States in the Christopher Nolan film The Dark Knight Rises. Devane reprised his role as James Heller, now President, in the limited-run series 24: Live Another Day, which premiered in May 2014.

Devane was also part of the regular cast of the sitcom The Grinder. He had a cameo role as Williams, as part of NASA, in the 2014 film Interstellar.

Devane is currently a spokesman for Rosland Capital.

Personal life
Devane married Eugenie Devane in 1961. They have two sons. One of his sons, Joshua Devane, is also an actor. Their older son, Bill Devane, died in an accident.

Filmography

Film

Television 

N.Y.P.D. (3 episodes, 1967–1969)  
Medical Center (1 episode, 1970 "Ghetto Clinic")
Young Dr. Kildare (1 episode, 1972) 
Gunsmoke (1 episode, 1973)
The Bait (1973)
Mannix (1 episode, 1974) 
Hawaii Five-O (1 episode, 1974) 
The Missiles of October (TV Movie, 1974)
Fear on Trial (1975)
Red Alert (1977)
Black Beauty (1978)
From Here to Eternity (1979) 
From Here to Eternity (11 episodes, 1980) 
Red Flag: The Ultimate Game (1981) 
The Other Victim (1981)
The Big Easy (unsold TV pilot, 1982)
Insight (1 episode, 1982)
Jane Doe (1983) 
With Intent to Kill (1984)
Timestalkers (1987)
Murder C.O.D. (1990)
A Woman Named Jackie (1991)
Nightmare in Columbia County (aka Victim of Beauty, 1991)
Knots Landing (269 episodes, 1983–1993)
Phenom (21 episodes, 1993–1994)  
Lois & Clark: The New Adventures of Superman (1 episode, 1994) 
For the Love of Nancy (TV Movie, 1994)
Falling from the Sky: Flight 174 (TV Movie, 1995)
Virus (TV Movie, 1995)
Night Watch (TV Movie, 1995)
The Monroes (8 episodes, 1995) 
Doomsday Rock (TV Movie, 1997)
Timecop (1 episode, 1997)
Knots Landing: Back to the Cul-de-Sac (1997) 
Touched by an Angel (1 episode, 1997)
Turks (13 episodes, 1999) 
Early Edition (5 episodes, 1997–1999) 
The Michael Richards Show (7 episodes, 2000) 
Judging Amy (1 episode, 2002)
The X-Files (1 episode, "The Truth" 2002) 
A Christmas Visitor (2002, TV Movie) 
The West Wing (2 episodes, 2003) 
Stargate SG-1 (3 episodes, 2004) 
Crumbs (13 episodes, 2006) 
Jesse Stone: Death in Paradise (2006)
What About Brian (6 episodes, 2006–2007) 
24 (20 episodes, 2005–2007) 
Jesse Stone: Sea Change (2007)
Jesse Stone: Thin Ice (2009)
Jesse Stone: No Remorse (2010)
King of the Hill (1 episode, 2010)
Psych (1 episode, 2010) 
NCIS (1 episode, 2010) 
Jesse Stone: Innocents Lost (2011)
Good Morning, Killer (2011)
Jesse Stone: Benefit of the Doubt (2012)
Revenge (2 episodes, 2012) 
24: Live Another Day (12 episodes, 2014)
The Grinder (22 episodes, 2015)
Jesse Stone: Lost in Paradise (TV Movie, 2015) 
 Bosch: Legacy  (4 episodes to date as of May 11, 2022)

References

External links

1939 births
Living people
Male actors from New York (state)
American Academy of Dramatic Arts alumni
American male film actors
American male television actors
American male stage actors
American people of Dutch descent
American people of German descent
American people of Irish descent
Actors from Albany, New York
20th-century American male actors
21st-century American male actors